Patrick Richard Henry Wright, Baron Wright of Richmond,  (28 June 1931 – 6 March 2020) was a British diplomat who served as Head of HM Diplomatic Service.

He sat in the House of Lords as a crossbencher from 10 February 1994 until his retirement on 17 December 2019.

Background
Patrick Wright was the son of Herbert and Rachel Wright. He was educated at Marlborough College. Having served in the Royal Artillery in 1950 and 1951, he went up to Merton College, Oxford where he graduated with a Bachelor of Arts in Literae humaniores in 1955.

Diplomatic career
He joined HM Diplomatic Service in 1955 and went to study Arabic at MECAS in Lebanon from 1956 to 1957. He was posted as Second Secretary in the British Embassy in Beirut from 1958 to 1960. Between 1960 and 1965, he was Private Secretary to the Ambassador and First Secretary in the Washington DC Embassy, between 1965 and 1967 Private Secretary to the FCO's Permanent Under-Secretary of State (PUS) and First Secretary and Head of Chancery in the British Embassy in Cairo between 1967 and 1970. Wright was Deputy Political Resident in Bahrain in 1971 and 1972, Head of Middle East Department in the Foreign and Commonwealth Office from 1972 to 1974, and Private Secretary (Overseas Affairs) to two Prime Ministers, Harold Wilson and James Callaghan from 1974 to 1977. In 1977, Patrick Wright was appointed Ambassador to Luxembourg and to Syria in 1979, where he remained until 1981. He was Deputy Under-Secretary of State at the FCO from 1982 to 1984.

Sir Patrick Wright was appointed Ambassador to Saudi Arabia from 1984 to 1986. For the next five years he combined the roles of PUS at the FCO and Head of HM Diplomatic Service until he retired in 1991.

Post retirement
In 1991, Lord Wright became a Director of Barclays Bank until 1996, of British Petroleum until 2001, of De La Rue until 2000, of Unilever until 1999 and of BAA until 1998.

Between 1993 and 2002, he was a member of the Security Commission. He was a member of the Council of Chatham House (Royal Institute of International Affairs) from 1992 to 1999, and chairman from 1995 to 1999. He was Member of Council of Atlantic College between 1993 and 2000, and of the Royal College of Music from 1991 to 2001. Wright was Governor of the Ditchley Foundation from 1986 until his death in 2020. From 1991 to 2001, he was a Governor of Wellington College, from 1991 to 1995 Registrar of the Most Venerable Order of St John of Jerusalem, and Director of Overseas Relations from 1995 to 1997. He was a founding trustee of the UK-based family support charity Home-Start International, of which he was Chairman from 2004 to 2007.

Honours
In the 1978 New Year Honours, Wright was appointed to the Order of St Michael and St George as a Companion (CMG), promoted to be a Knight Commander (KCMG) in the 1984 Birthday Honours, and again to be a Knight Grand Cross (GCMG) in the 1989 Birthday Honours. One year later he was appointed to the Order of St John as a Knight (KStJ). In the 1994 New Year Honours, it was announced that he would become a life peer and he was raised to the peerage as Baron Wright of Richmond, of Richmond upon Thames in the London Borough of Richmond upon Thames on 10 February 1994.

Family
Patrick Wright married Virginia Anne Gaffney in 1958. They had two sons, Marcus (born 1959) and Angus (born 1964), and one daughter, Olivia, Lady McDonald (born 1963), wife of Simon McDonald, Baron McDonald of Salford (later also Permanent Under-Secretary at the Foreign and Commonwealth Office and Head of the Diplomatic Service).

Arms

References

External links
WRIGHT OF RICHMOND, Who's Who 2014, A & C Black, 2014 (online edition, Oxford University Press, 2014)
 https://upload.wikimedia.org/wikipedia/commons/6/6d/Diplomatic_Cable_signed_by_D.A._Greenhill%2C_dated_August_24%2C_1966.jpg

1931 births
2020 deaths
People educated at Marlborough College
Alumni of Merton College, Oxford
Wright of Richmond 
Diplomatic peers
Members of HM Diplomatic Service
Knights Grand Cross of the Order of St Michael and St George
Knights of the Order of St John
People associated with the Royal College of Music
Ambassadors of the United Kingdom to Syria
Chairs of the Joint Intelligence Committee (United Kingdom)
Ambassadors of the United Kingdom to Luxembourg
Ambassadors of the United Kingdom to Saudi Arabia
Permanent Under-Secretaries of State for Foreign Affairs
British colonial political officers
Private secretaries in the British Civil Service
20th-century British diplomats
Life peers created by Elizabeth II